Kim Seung-woo (c. February 24, 1969) is a South Korean actor who participated in various films, television series and variety shows through out 1990 until 2022. He also works in different media platforms such as playing a talk show host role.

Filmography

Film

Chasing (2016)
Horny Family (2013)
I Am a Dad (2011) 
71: Into the Fire (2010) 
IRIS: The Movie (2010)
Curling Love (2007) 
Between Love and Hate (2006) 
Woman on the Beach (2006) 
Heaven's Soldiers (2005)
Once Upon a Time in a Battlefield (2003) (cameo) 
Spring Breeze (2003) 
Reversal of Fortune (2003) 
Break Out (2002)
Yesterday (2002) 
Secret Tears (2000) 
A Growing Business (1999)
Scent of a Man (1998) 
Tie a Yellow Ribbon (1998) (cameo)
The Man with Flowers (1997) 
Deep Blue (1997) 
Ghost Mamma (1996) 
Do You Believe in Jazz? (1996) 
Corset (1996) 
Millions in My Account (1995) 
A Hot Roof (1995) 
Horror Express (1994)
The 101st Proposition (1993) 
General's Son III (1992) 
The Woman Who Won't Divorce (1992)
Kkok-Ji-Ddan (1990) 
Portrait of the Days of Youth (1990) 
General's Son (1990)

Television series

President Jeong Yak-yong (SKY TV, 2022) – Jeong Yak-yong; Television Film  
Late Night Restaurant (SBS, 2015) 
Iris II: New Generation (KBS2, 2013)
The Third Hospital (tvN, 2012)
My Husband Got a Family (KBS2, 2012) (cameo, ep 5–6) 
Miss Ripley (MBC, 2011)
Athena: Goddess of War (SBS, 2010–2011) 
Queen of Reversals (MBC, 2010–2011) (cameo, ep 7)
IRIS (KBS2, 2009) 
Queen of Housewives (MBC, 2009) (cameo, ep 3)
How to Meet a Perfect Neighbor (SBS, 2007) 
Special of My Life (MBC, 2006) 
Rosemary (KBS2, 2003) 
Hotelier (MBC, 2001) 
Mr. Duke (MBC, 2000) 
Memories (MBC, 1998) 
Cinderella (MBC, 1997) 
Scent of Apple Blossoms (MBC, 1996) 
Their Embrace (MBC, 1996) 
The Basics of Romance (MBC, 1995)
Spider (MBC, 1995)
Making a Marriage (1994)

Variety show
 2 Days & 1 Night – Season 2 (2012–2013)
 Win Win (2010–2013)
 Mr. House Husband (2016–2017)
 Camping in Love (2022) - Host

Theater
Dreamgirls (2009)

Awards
2012 KBS Entertainment Awards: Top Excellence Award, Male MC in a Variety Show (2 Days & 1 Night, Win Win)
2011 KBS Entertainment Awards: Excellence Award, Male MC in a Variety Show (Win Win)
2010 KBS Entertainment Awards: Best Male Newcomer in a Variety Show (Win Win)
2009 KBS Drama Awards: Excellence Award, Actor in a Mid-length Drama (IRIS)
2006 Chunsa Film Art Awards: Popularity Award
2003 KBS Drama Awards: Popularity Award (Rosemary)
2003 KBS Drama Awards: Best Couple Award with Yoo Ho-jeong (Rosemary)
1998 MBC Drama Awards: Top Excellence Award, Actor

References

External links
  
 
 
 

South Korean male musical theatre actors
South Korean male stage actors
South Korean male television actors
South Korean male film actors
Male actors from Seoul
1969 births
Living people
20th-century South Korean male actors
21st-century South Korean male actors